This is a list of characters from the animated series X-Men.

Hero teams

X-Men
 Cyclops / Scott Summers (voiced by Norm Spencer) - The field commander of the X-Men. This version of Cyclops is very similar to the comic book version. While he is generally stiff, he has expressed doubts to his own leadership from time to time. His love is Jean Grey, who he eventually marries towards the end of the series. Cyclops is shown to be in his late twenties.
Powers: His eyes emit a powerful burst of light energy that can cause devastating damage. He can only control them if he closes his eyes or hides them behind ruby-quartz crystals (usually in the form of sunglasses).

 Wolverine / Logan (voiced by Cathal J. Dodd) - Wolverine is nearly taken straight from the comics. Though he never kills his opponents, it has been implied several times that he would if the other X-Men were not there to hold him back. He dons the classic yellow and blue costume from the comics. Wolverine is also in love with Jean Grey, who is Cyclops's girlfriend for most of the series. This and Cyclops's decision to leave Morph and Beast behind following an attack from the Sentinels led to Wolverine feeling a great resentment for the X-Men leader. Wolverine remembers very little about his past. One difference from the comic version is that Wolverine actually sees the claws when they first come out his hands.
Powers: Wolverine's mutation is an incredible regenerative power and heightened senses. His claws and adamantium endoskeleton are not part of his original mutant abilities and are, while considered unique, an artificial addition.

 Rogue / Anna Marie (voiced by Lenore Zann) - In her green and yellow costume with a brown leather jacket, Rogue is virtually interchangeable with her early 1990s comic incarnation. She speaks in a sassy, Southern accent and generally has an attitude of good-humored irreverence. Her impressive powers of super-strength, invulnerability, and flight are frequently demonstrated early in the series. Also in line with the comics are her deeply harbored, usually hidden feelings of isolation. Gambit flirts with her, and though she feels equally attracted to him, her fear of harming him with her powers causes her to push him away, thus driving her to further solitary, brooding soul-searching. She was the adopted daughter of Mystique, after running away from home when her father rejected her for being a mutant. Like her comic book counterpart, she put her boyfriend, Cody, in a coma when her powers manifested during her first kiss. Rogue is shown in her mid-twenties.
Powers: Rogue has the ability to draw a human's energy from a mere touch, causing unconsciousness and, in some cases, elongated comas. This allows her to absorb their psyche, skills, and powers for a short time. Her powers of super strength and flight are revealed to have come from Ms. Marvel, who Rogue nearly killed by draining so much of her energy that the absorbed powers became permanent, and Ms. Marvel fell into an almost permanent coma.

 Storm / Ororo Monroe (voiced by Iona Morris, then Alison Sealy-Smith) - Storm's origins are very true to the comics. She was orphaned at an early age and spent her childhood living on the streets, often stealing in order to survive. Early in the series, Storm defeats Callisto to become the leader of the Morlocks, a position she later gives back to Calisto. Like her comic counterpart, Storm is claustrophobic.
Powers: Storm is capable of controlling weather of all varieties to a large array of manifestations. She can also use bursts of wind to enable her power of flight.

 Beast / Henry "Hank" McCoy (voiced by George Buza) - Beast is seen as the gentle giant. Beast is kind-hearted and highly intellectual. In the episode "Beauty and the Beast" (season 2), Beast's other side is shown when he falls in love with a young blind patient whom he is treating, and the Friends of Humanity kidnap her. Beast shows his natural aggression when invading their headquarters.
Powers: His natural powers are supreme agility and super strength. An experiment to remove him of his powers, however, caused him to grow blue fur and mutated his body to that somewhat akin to a gorilla.

 Gambit / Remy Lebeau (voiced by Chris Potter from 1992 to 1996, then by Tony Daniels in 1997) - Gambit is originally from New Orleans and speaks with a thick Cajun accent. He is seen as the very laid-back character. Gambit's past is explored in the episode "X-ternally Yours" (season 2), revealing his affiliation with the civil war between thieves and assassins. As mentioned before, he is seen flirting with Rogue whenever possible. They both share an obscure relationship, but as the series goes on their relationship develops into a more mature, loving one. While outwardly Gambit is shown to have a cocky bravado personality, several episodes reveal that he has a deeper side, showing his strong sense of honor and devout loyalty to those he considers family (namely the X-Men), like in the episode "Sanctuary (part 2)," when Gambit sacrifices himself in order to let the others escape. In the episode "X-ternally Yours," Remy passes up the chance to wipe out the Assassins Guild and chooses the X-Men over any ties he has to either guild, telling Belladonna Boudreaux, "I am not Thief, or Assassin. I am an X-Man, and I'm never coming back." Gambit is shown to be in his late twenties.
Powers: Gambit is able to charge any object with a kinetic energy and, when thrown, these objects become explosive. His durable strength and agility possibly also come from this ability, charging himself with a potent amount of energy to undertake many tasks that normal humans cannot perform.

 Jubilee / Jubilation Lee (voiced by Alyson Court) - The youngest of the X-Men, Jubilee was an orphan and was sent to many foster homes. In the first episode, she was captured by the Mutant Control Agency as bait to draw out the X-Men, but was rescued at the end. Jubilee is a some-what carefree girl, who wants to be seen as an adult in the eyes of her counterparts. Nevertheless, the team appreciate her involvement in the team. Her costume is the same as it is the comics. She is always trying to get involved in the missions, but is always excluded because of her age, much to her frustration., Despite all that she always helps the team prevail on missions. 
Powers: Jubilee is able to create pyro-kinetic sparks from her hands, which she can use to strike things from a distance, or disable machinery from her very touch.

 Jean Grey (voiced by Catherine Disher) - As in the comics, Jean Grey is the heart-and-soul figure of the X-Men, usually seen at the side of Professor X as he discusses the purposes and activities of the team. Her costume is basically the one introduced in Uncanny X-Men #281 when she joined Storm's Gold Team, although her red hair is tied-back rather than hanging loose. Her and Scott's relationship is deepened and she takes on a central role in the "Phoenix Saga." Unlike most adaptations, in the animated series Jean was Xavier's first student. 
Powers: Jean has mastered the skill of telekinesis, the ability to move objects with her mind, along with some minor telepathic skill similar to Professor X. Her powers manifest themselves and she is possessed by the entity, the Phoenix, whose powers expand upon her own, but eventually turn to evil when she refuses to leave the sensation of being in a human body.

 Professor X / Charles Xavier (voiced by Cedric Smith) - The founder of the X-Men, Professor Xavier is very similar to his comic book counterpart, and his friendship with Magneto is explored in greater detail during this series. Differing slightly from the comics, Xavier is stated to have lost the use of his legs "battling Magneto" in the episode "Sanctuary" and instead of a wheelchair, he uses an orange hover-chair. He is shown at times to be a lonely man, such as when he sadly watches Moira MacTaggart and Banshee embrace. In the "Phoenix Saga," Xavier's dark side briefly manifests itself.
Powers: Charles possesses supremely powerful telepathic abilities, allowing him to see peoples' minds or to control their thoughts or actions, though the latter is not used for his personal gain.

 Morph / Kevin Sydney (voiced by Ron Ruben) - Morph was a member of the X-Men and a close friend of Wolverine who was apparently killed in the first episode by Sentinels. He reappeared as a recurring villain in the second season where it was revealed that Mr. Sinister had saved and brainwashed him. Until the end of the season, through constant assurance from his teammates, Morph helped battle Sinister. Professor X finally removed his implants, but he needed much more rehabilitation. Morph later appeared in the episode "Courage," and in the series finale, "Graduation Day," where he briefly appeared as Professor X, while the professor was sick and dying due to an illness. He appeared to have more of his past snickering humor, probably suggesting that he was now mentally healthy and back on the team, this time permanently.
Powers: Morph is capable of shape-shifting and assuming any form that he comes across. This power is not limited to humanoid life forms. Morph can change into animal forms as well.

X-Factor
X-Factor is the mutant U.S. government group that was most notably seen in the episode "Cold Comfort". However, X-Factor also could be seen briefly in episodes Sanctuary Parts 1 and 2.

 Forge - Forge guest-starred in a few episodes. He is unique in that he has two separate roles in the show: in the present, he is the leader of the government-run X-Factor team; and in the future, he leads the mutant team called Xavier's Security Enforcers, that resists the Sentinels in the "Days of Future Past" time-line.
Powers: Intuitive genius for invention; and he has a cyborg leg.

 Polaris / Lorna Dane - Polaris appears in the episode "Cold Comfort" as a member of X-Factor. Polaris had been a member of the X-Men alongside her boyfriend, Iceman, though they eventually left to pursue a normal life. However, Polaris left Iceman and became a member of X-Factor and fell in love with Havok. She was later featured in the second part of the episode "Phalanx Covenant," in which she aided Beast, Magneto, Forge, Warlock, and Amelia Voght in their battle with the extraterrestrial Phalanx Empire.
Powers: Manipulates electromagnetism allowing her to fly, create force-fields, project concussive blasts, and manipulate ferrous materials.

 Havok / Alex Summers - Havok guest-starred in the episode "Cold Comfort" as a member of X-Factor and was revealed to be romantically involved with Iceman's ex-girlfriend, Lorna Dane. In the episode, X-Factor fights against the X-Men for a "friendly skirmish," as Forge puts it. It is never openly stated in the animated series that Cyclops and Havok are indeed long-lost brothers, though Alex's existence is revealed in flashbacks. When the two meet they develop an instant rivalry and neither brother's powers affect the other; a fact which is also seen in the comics. Havok is also seen in Season 1's Days of Future Past Part 2, when Bishop tells the X-Men what will happen in the future. 
Powers: Metabolizes cosmic radiation and discharges it as energy blasts from his arms.

 Multiple Man / James Madrox - Multiple Man appeared in the episode "Cold Comfort" as a member of X-Factor.
Powers: Self-duplication by absorbing kinetic energy.

 Quicksilver / Pietro Maximoff (voiced by Paul Haddad) - Quicksilver guest-starred in a couple of episodes. His most noticeable appearance is in the story, "Family Ties" (season 4), where along with his sister, the Scarlet Witch, they look for their long-lost father and discover that he is Magneto.
Powers: Superhuman speed.

 Strong Guy (Guido Carosella) - Strong Guy appears in the episode "Cold Comfort" as a member of X-Factor.
Powers: Rechannels kinetic energy into physical strength.

 Wolfsbane / Rahne Sinclair - Wolfsbane appears in the episode "Cold Comfort" as a member of X-Factor.
Powers: Morphs into a werewolf-like humanoid.

Alpha Flight
Alpha Flight was seen in the episode "Repo Man." Vindicator (who had renamed himself Guardian in the comics) and the Canadian Alpha Flight capture Wolverine. The Canadian government demand their project back. Either he joins their team as originally planned or they repossess his indestructible, adamantium skeleton.

 Vindicator / James MacDonald Hudson (voiced by Barry Flatman) - Alpha Flight's leader.
Powers: Powered suit allows him to fly, fire energy blasts, and create a personal force field.

 Shaman / Michael Twoyoungmen (voiced by Don Francks)
 Puck / Eugene Milton Judd (voiced by Don Francks)
Powers: Superhuman strength, agility, reflexes, and durability.

 Snowbird / Narya (voiced by Melissa Sue Anderson)
Powers: Flight, and can morph into Arctic creatures.

 Northstar / Jean Paul Beaubier (voiced by Rene Lemieux) - Northstar appeared in the episodes "Slave Island" and "Repo Man." Though he didn't have any speaking role in "Slave Island," the episode "Repo Man" proved to hold true to the character's origins as his trademark French Canadian accent was present. In "Slave Island" Jean-Paul was a hostage/prisoner of the island nation of Genosha. He, along with many other mutants, provided slave labor for the government using their mutant skills for such tasks as building dams and the like. They wore special collars that restricted them from using their powers to escape and slept in prison-like cells. They eventually escaped Genosha with the help of the X-Men. In "Repo Man," Northstar is shown as part of the Canadian special forces team Alpha Flight, which tries to convince former member Wolverine to re-join.
Powers: Flight, generates a flash of blinding light when slapping hands with his sister, Aurora.

 Aurora / Jeanne Marie Beaubier (voiced by Jennifer Dale) - Aurora appeared in the episodes "Slave Island" and "Repo Man."
Powers: Flight, generates a flash of blinding light when slapping hands with her brother, Northstar.

 Sasquatch / Dr. Walter Langowski (voiced by Harvey Atkin)
Powers: Scientific genius. Massive, ape-like, furred form with superhuman strength, healing factor, and sharp claws and teeth.

 Dr. Heather Hudson (voiced by Rebecca Jenkins)

Xavier's Security Enforcers and The Resistance (in Bishop's future)
 Forge - This aged version of Forge leads Xavier's Security Enforcers, a team that resists the Sentinels in the "Days of Future Past" time-line, alongside Wolverine, Bishop, and Shard. In the altered time-line, created when Fitzroy murdered Professor X, Forge is a servant of Master Mold, having been transformed into a cyborg like his counterpart in the Age of Apocalypse.
 Wolverine - This aged version of Wolverine is also a member of the Resistance.
 Bishop / Lucas Bishop (voiced by Philip Akin) - Bishop was originally a "tracker," a mutant collaborating with the Sentinels hunting down members of the Resistance until he was deemed unnecessary and marked for extermination, which prompted him to join the Resistance. He travels back in time to stop the assassination of Senator Kelly and prevent the "Days of Future Past" time-line from occurring (with Bishop assuming Kate Pryde's role from the comic version of this tale). While he succeeds in saving Kelly, in his time-line there is no recollection of the X-Men as they have all died. Later, he returns to stop the spread of Apocalypse's techno-organic virus; however, he also faces resistance from Cable, who knows the virus is necessary as it will also lead to the salvation of mutant-kind. He also shows up in some more episodes, where he and his sister travel back in time to stop Fitzroy from killing Xavier in the past, causing constant war between mutants and humans in the X-Men's time, and his time changes into one in which the few surviving mutants are known only as slaves to Master Mold. They eventually manage to save Xavier, but Bishop gets trapped in the Axis of Time when Apocalypse throws him out of time. He eventually saves the entire time-line when he accidentally begins to free the psychics in the "Beyond Good and Evil" arc.
Powers: Absorbs energy directed towards him and releases it as energy blasts from his hands.

 Shard / Shard Bishop (voiced by Kay Tremblay) - Shard is seen in the "Beyond Good and Evil" storyline, when Bishop is sucked back into the time-portal and trapped in the Axis of Time. Shard comes back to the present to find her brother; however, when she gets to the present, she sees Mr. Sinister trying to kidnap Professor X, so she stops him. Then she asks the X-Men for help in finding her brother.
Powers: Energy blasts from her hands.

 Malcolm and Randall are shown as members in Shard's video recordings.

Clan Chosen (in Cable's future)
 Cable / Nathan Christopher Summers (voiced by Lawrence Bayne) - Cable's first two appearances were in "Slave Island" and "The Cure." There was no explanation or back story given for how he time-traveled into the past, although his mission involved stopping the production of collars that could inhibit mutant powers. Later, he appeared in the two-part episode "Time Fugitives," where Cable travels back in time to stop Bishop from preventing the outbreak of Apocalypse's techno-virus. "Time Fugitives" and "Beyond Good and Evil" established Cable's back story as waging a war along with his comrades, Clan Chosen, against Apocalypse, as well as the New Canaanite government, in a dystopian future. It is also hinted that he is the son of Cyclops and Jean Grey.
Powers: Telepathy and telekinesis, a techno-organic arm, and "bodyslide" (a form of teleportation).

 Tyler / Tyler Dayspring - Genesis is Cable's son. He appears as a child in "Time Fugitives," when Cable's time-line starts restoring itself, so Cable goes back in time to stop Bishop from preventing the plague. Later he appeared as a young adult in "Beyond Good and Evil," when the Clan Chosen go to destroy Apocalypse's Lazarus Chamber in 3999 A.D.
 Hope, Dawnsilk, Boak, and Garrison Kane were also shown as Clan Chosen members, but only Hope had a speaking part. They appeared in cameos working alongside Cable and Tyler.

X-Terminators (unnamed)
 Rusty, Skids (voiced by Tara Strong), Boomer, and Wiz-Kid were featured as orphans in the episode "No Mutant is an Island". The episode mostly focused on Cyclops and Rusty. In the episode, Cyclops, still in mourning after Jean Grey's "death," quits the X-Men and returns to his orphanage home in Nebraska. A man known as Killgrave offered to help and adopted the orphans seemingly out of charity. In reality, Killgrave, a mutant himself with telepathic abilities, wanted to use the children to make them his army to destroy all humans in the world so that mutants are accepted. Killgrave brainwashes the four and uses them to storm the governor's mansion so he can make the governor his mind-controlled slave. Scott was able to snap Rusty and the others out of Killgrave's hypnotic brainwashing in the end and save the mutant children. Later, Cyclops returns to the mansion and he and the other X-Men discover that Jean Grey has not perished after all.
Powers:Rusty: Fire generation.Skids: Anti-friction personal force-field.Boom-Boom: Creates balls of explosive energy.Wiz-Kid: Techno-morphic abilities.

The Mutant Resistance (in the Xavier-less time-line)
This was the team created by Magneto in an alternate time-line after Xavier was killed in early life in the episode "One Man's Worth," in which the humans and mutants were locked in a war.

 Magneto - The leader.
 Wolverine
 Storm
 Beast
 Nurse Jean Grey
 Dr. Summers (only mentioned)
 Rogue
 Mimic
 Nightcrawler (Age of Apocalypse version)
 Morph (Age of Apocalypse version)
 Jason Wyngarde
 Sabretooth (Age of Apocalypse version)
 Holocaust (Age of Apocalypse version)
 Mr. Sinister
 Colossus (Age of Apocalypse version)
 Wild Child (Age of Apocalypse version)
 Gambit - In this version, Gambit has lost an arm.
 Joanna Cargill
 Blob
 Caliban
 Callisto
 Masque
 Pyro
 Banshee (Age of Apocalypse version)
 Polaris (Age of Apocalypse version)
 Blink (Age of Apocalypse version)
 Angel (Age of Apocalypse version)
 Sunfire (Shiro Yoshida) (Age of Apocalypse version)
 An unknown, blue-haired, red-masked mutant with force-field projection.

Guest allies
 Banshee / Sean Cassidy (voiced by Jeremy Ratchford) - Moira's fiancé.
Powers: Superhuman scream.

 Phoenix - The entire saga of the Phoenix is retold in the third season, divided into the five-part "Phoenix Saga," in which Jean acquires the power of the Phoenix; the battle for the M'Kraan crystal; the "Dark Phoenix Saga," showcasing the battle with the Hellfire Club; the Phoenix's transformation into Dark Phoenix; and the battle to decide Jean's fate. These particular episodes are as close as the cartoon came to directly duplicating the comic book storyline. The "Dark Phoenix Saga" is so accurate to the original stories that the episodes have the additional credit, "Based on stories by Chris Claremont." Rather than destroying an inhabited system, the animated story had her destroy a deserted system and only disable the attacking Shi'ar cruiser. After the Phoenix left Jean's body, Jean retained her original powers, whereas in the aborted comic book ending, she would have been lobotomized by the Shi'ar and lost them entirely.
 Colossus / Piotr Rasputin (voiced by Rick Bennett, then by Robert Cait) - The X-Men help Colossus when he was framed for crimes committed by Juggernaut. He later comes to them when Omega Red is attacking Russia.
Powers: Transforms his body into organic steel, obtaining superhuman strength.

 Illyana Rasputina (voiced by Tara Strong) - Illyana appeared the episode "Red Dawn." In that episode, she and her mother remained by the side of Colossus and the X-Men as they fought the newly released Omega Red. She also appeared in one of Cable's visions of the altered timestream in "Time Fugitives," in which, without the antibodies developed to fight Apocalypse's techno-organic virus, many mutants, like Illyana, developed harmful mutations which killed them.
 Nightcrawler / Kurt Wagner (voiced by Adrian Hough) - Nightcrawler only made guest appearances in the episodes "Nightcrawler" and "Bloodlines" and never joined the X-Men. He was shown first in an episode that featured him as a monk in a Swiss abbey, persecuted by one of his superiors and the townspeople who believed him to be a demon. Gambit, Rogue, and Wolverine helped him through his trials. The second episode reveals his origins as the birth son of Mystique, discovered by his foster-sister Rogue. In the end, after a discussion, Mystique apparently dies to save both of them from Graydon Creed.
Powers: Teleportation, sticks to surfaces, night vision, blends into shadows.

 Psylocke / Elizabeth Braddock - Psylocke appears during the fourth season in the episode "The Promise of Apocalypse" (Beyond Good and Evil, part 2), and in the episode "End and Beginning" (Beyond Good and Evil, part 4). In this storyline, Psylocke appears to be a lone warrior who practices theft with a cause (a-la-Robin Hood). She comes into direct conflict with Archangel and, later on, Sabretooth and Mystique. She refers to her brother as fighting to help mutants, but does not name him as Captain Britain.
Powers: Fires psychic "knives" from distance.

 Angel / Archangel / Warren Worthington III (voiced by Stephen Ouimette) - Archangel's origin was retold in the series, where Apocalypse creates the Four Horsemen of the Apocalypse. Angel goes to a scientist who claims he can "cure" mutancy, but it is actually Mystique, a servant of Apocalypse, who turns him into Death. Angel also makes a cameo appearance in the "Beyond Good and Evil" four-part episode, and as one of the original X-Men in two flashbacks. In this version, he overcomes the Death persona to become Archangel thanks to Rogue, who saps the evil that lay within him when she touches him.
Powers: Winged flight, later razor sharp metallic wings and feathers.

 Silver Fox - Silver Fox appeared in the episode "Weapon X, Lies & Videotape." In this continuity, she too was a member of Team X, Wolverine's lover, and a victim of the Weapon X program.
 Maverick / Christoph Nord - Maverick appeared in the episode "Weapon X, Lies & Videotape," searching for answers about his past and his involvement with Weapon X, teaming with Wolverine, Sabretooth, and Silver Fox. In the episode "Whatever It Takes," the character Morph briefly turns into Maverick to taunt Wolverine. Maverick also appears in flashbacks that depict himself and Wolverine battling Omega Red, though that memory could be one of Weapon X's implanted memories.
 Darkstar / Laynia Petrovna (voiced by Elizabeth Rukavina) - Darkstar guest-starred in the episode "Red Dawn." She is initially the mutant enforcer for a group of rogue Russian generals seeking to reestablish the Soviet Union with the aid of Omega Red. After witnessing the crimes committed by Omega Red, Darkstar rebels against the generals and sides with the X-Men and Colossus.
Powers: Darkforce manipulation allows her to fly and create force fields.

 Lilandra Neramani (voiced by Camilla Scott) - Lilandra appeared in the third season. There, she sought the help of Professor X and his X-Men to help her defeat her evil brother D'Ken. During the short time they shared alone, Xavier and Lilandra quickly fell in love and eventually managed to defeat D'Ken. When Lilandra became the new heir to the Shi'ar throne, she kissed and thanked Xavier for his help and even offered for him to join her, but he declined to do this for as long as there is no peace between mankind and mutants. Lilandra left, but eventually returned to Earth when Xavier became deadly ill in the final episode of the show. She took Xavier to the Shi'ar Empire with her so they could heal him.
Powers: Minor telepathy.

 Sage Araki
 Longshot (voiced by Rod Wilson) - Longshot appeared in the episodes "Mojovision" and "Longshot." In the animated series, it seemed to indicate that he might have a relationship with Spiral.
Powers: Probability manipulation (good luck), superhuman agility.

 Ka-Zar / Kevin Plunder (voiced by Robert Bockstael) and Zabu - Ka-Zar and Zabu appeared in the episodes "Reunion" (parts 1 and 2) and "Savage Land, Strange Heart" (parts 1 and 2).
 Shanna (voiced by Megan Smith) - Shanna is Ka-Zar's wife.
 Warlock (voiced by David Corban) - Warlock's history was altered so that he actually came to Earth in an effort to escape his destiny of merging with the Phalanx.
 Cannonball / Sam Guthrie - Cannonball made a small appearance along with his sister, Paige Guthrie, in the episode "Hidden Agenda." The episode featured Rogue learning about a new mutant that had been making waves in her hometown. However, his appearance caused a violation of continuity, as Cannonball had already made a cameo appearance (on a video screen in "Night of the Sentinels"), already employing his mutant power, and with blond hair.
 Captain America / Steve Rogers (voiced by Lawrence Bayne) - Captain America appears in the episode "Old Soldiers." He is an American agent, sent along with the Canadian Wolverine, to rescue a scientist kidnapped by the Red Skull and the Nazis. He is present in the episode only in Wolverine's flashbacks. He was also seen in a cameo appearance in the episode "Red Dawn."
 Ms. Marvel / Carol Danvers (voiced by Roscoe Handford) - Ms. Marvel appears in the episode "A Rogue's Tale" (season 2), where she haunts Rogue for stealing her powers and leaving her in a coma.
 Scarlet Witch / Wanda Maximoff (voiced by Susan Roman) - The Scarlet Witch made both a guest and a cameo appearance. She appeared in the episode "Family Ties" along with Quicksilver, when they tried to find out who their father is.
 Mjnari - Mjnari appeared in the episode "Whatever It Takes." In this episode, the Shadow King takes over Mjnari's body, so Rogue and Storm go to Africa to help him. Mjnari is a mutant with superhuman speed. He is also Storm's godson.
 Darrell Tanaka - A mutant healer in the mutant town of Skull Mesa. Like Mjnari, he's an original character.
 Iceman / Bobby Drake (voiced by Denis Akiyama) - Bobby Drake appeared as a former member of the team, who quit due to disagreements with Xavier. He appears in the episode "Cold Comfort" where he gets Jubilee's help to rescue his girlfriend Lorna Dane (not called Polaris here) from a government facility which is housing the X-Factor. In the series, Iceman was seen in many flashbacks which include "Sanctuary (part 1)" and "Xavier Remembers."
 Dazzler / Alison Blaire - Dazzler appeared as a background character in "Mojovision," and was central to the plot of "Dark Phoenix Saga (part 1): Dazzled."
 Senator Robert Kelly (voiced by Len Carlson) - Robert Kelly ran for president on an anti-mutant campaign during the beginning of the show's first season. Kelly came to befriend the X-Men and support mutants shortly after his election as president in the season's final episode, after the X-Men had rescued him from both an assassination attempt by Mystique and an attempted brainwashing by Master Mold. In the first episode of season two, Kelly took office as president, spoke out in support of mutants, and made his first presidential act an official pardoning of Beast, who had been unfairly arrested early in season one. These actions led Kelly's former, anti-mutant supporters to feel betrayed by him and create the public anti-mutant backlash that pervaded the entire second season of the show. In the third through fifth seasons of the series, President Kelly had a low profile. He remained friendly with the X-Men through the show's end, working with them to confront global mutant threats such as Magneto building an armed, inhabitable, mutants-only asteroid in space during the fourth season.
 Cody Robbins - Cody was the first boy Rogue ever kissed, triggering her consciousness-stealing powers and putting him into a coma. He makes a flashback appearance in the episode "A Rogue's Tale" (season 2) and plays a supporting role in the episode "Love in Vain" (season 4) where he join forces with the Brood Colony to reunite with Rogue.

Neutral characters
 Magneto / Eric Magnus Lensherr (voiced by David Hemblen) - In the series, Magneto first appears in the third and fourth episodes as an antagonist where he launches nuclear missiles, but the X-Men stop it. Then he seeks to destroy a factory, but the X-Men stop him again. In the first season's finale, he helps the X-Men defeat the Master Mold and the Sentinels. He appears in nearly every episode in the second season, in which he and Professor Xavier are powerless and travel throughout the Savage Land. At the end of that season, the X-Men save them from Mr. Sinister, and they regain their powers. In the fourth season, he allies with Apocalypse but turns on him after discovering his true agenda and aids the X-Men in defeating him. Later, he constructs Asteroid M as a safe haven for mutants, but his dream is ruined by the fanatical Fabian Cortez. Broken, he secludes himself in the arctic and does not care about the possible destruction of life on Earth until he receives news from Beast, Forge, Mr. Sinister, and Amelia Voght that the Phalanx has kidnapped his son, Quicksilver, in the second part of the two-part, fifth-season premiere. He teams up with them to defeat the Phalanx and saves everyone he had captured. By the end of the series, he has gathered up an entire army of rebellious mutants, but receives news from Wolverine, Cyclops, and Jean Grey that Professor X is dying.
 The External / Candra - Candra is featured in the episode "X-Ternally Yours." In it, she has the same connection to the Thieves and Assassins as in the comics, offering them great power and protection in exchange for a decennial tithing, with those who broke the tithe punished greatly. She is not as inherently evil as her comic's counterpart, more focused on the tithe and ensuring its sanctity than any real criminal behavior. She eventually turns on the Assassins, after they threaten the tithe by kidnapping the Thieves' "chosen one" Bobby (Gambit's brother), and replacing their tithe with an empty box. She is represented as an African-American spirit, as opposed to a Caucasian mutant.

Neutral groups

Starjammers
The Starjammers appear in the five-part episode "Phoenix Saga" led by Corsair (Major Christopher Summers). In this episode, the Starjammers attack the X-Men and steal the M'Kraan crystal, in hopes of trading in to D'Ken so that Corsair can get close enough to kill him. However, D'Ken knew of their plan and tricked them, and got hold of the M'Kraan crystal. The Starjammers have to work with the X-Men to destroy D'Ken. Hepzibah, Raza Longknife, Ch'od, and Cr+eee were the Starjammers that appeared along with Corsair in the "Phoenix Saga." Corsair later appeared in the episode "Orphan's End." In this episode, Corsair is on the run from a corrupt Shi'ar police officer, and he comes to Earth. Later, he finds out that Cyclops is his son. They first accuse Storm of being a traitor and attack her, but after she explains to the Starjammers what was happening they help Cyclops and Corsair defeat the officer.

Acolytes
The Acolytes appear in the "Sanctuary" storyline, in which Magneto builds Asteroid M as a safe haven for all mutants to live away from the hatred of baseline humans. The Acolytes, led by Fabian Cortez, aid Magneto in the liberation of the Genoshan mutant slaves from the hands of the Genoshan magistrates. After Cortez betrays Magneto and he is believed to have been killed by the X-Men, the Acolytes pledge their loyalty to Cortez, though they turn on him after he is later exposed.

 Fabian Cortez (voiced by Lawrence Bayne) - Cortez appeared in the two-part episode "Sanctuary." As in the comic's storyline, Cortez was the leader of the Acolytes and used his powers to bolster Magneto's own abilities. However, Cortez's extreme anti-human sentiments led him to betray Magneto. Cortez threatened to destroy Earth but was stopped by the X-Men and Amelia Voght, who revealed Cortez's betrayal to the other Acolytes and the entire mutant population of Asteroid M. He was trapped in Asteroid M by a vengeful Magneto, but was rescued from its destruction by Apocalypse and Deathbird. Apocalypse granted him the ability of altering the mutations of other mutants. Cortez then appeared on the final season episode "The Fifth Horseman," now turned into a servant and worshipper of his savior. Cortez assembled a cult worshipping Apocalypse as well as the Hounds, a foursome of altered mutants, in an attempt to find a new body for Apocalypse, who was defeated and left bodiless in "Beyond Good and Evil." Cortez captured Jubilee and turned Beast into a feral monster, but was stopped by Caliban, one of the Hounds. After being defeated, Cortez begged Apocalypse to be forgiven for his failure; though Apocalypse was not angry at Cortez, for he still had a host body to reincarnate into...Cortez's own.
 Amelia Voght (voiced by Susan Roman) - Like her comics counterpart, Amelia was Charles Xavier's former lover and nurse. The two met and later fell in love after Xavier was crippled by Magneto, though they split because Amelia did not approve of the formation of the X-Men, preferring to live a quiet life with Charles and hide their mutant status. After meeting again in Asteroid M, she was initially hostile to Charles, though she forgave him after the X-Men helped defeat the fanatical Cortez. Amelia refused Charles' offer to join the X-Men, seeking now to find and follow her own dreams. She became a nurse once again and joined Moira MacTaggert at the facilities of Muir Island. She also helped Beast, Magneto, Forge, and Mister Sinister fight against the Phalanx.
 Marco Delgado
 Carmella Unuscione - Carmella appeared in episode "Sanctuary" as a prominent member of the Acolytes. As in the mainstream Marvel Universe, she was a devoted and passionate follower of Magneto and his beliefs.
 Chrome / Allen Marc Yuric
 Joanna Cargill - Joanna appeared in episode "Sanctuary." Though she did not have any speaking lines, she was a prominent member of the Acolytes. She also had a cameo in the first part of "One Man's Worth," where she was a member of the Mutant Resistance, but retained her Acolyte outfit.
 Burner / Byron Calley - Burner appeared as a member of the Acolytes and, using his real name in the two-part episode "Sanctuary," was one of the many mutants that took Magneto's offer to live in Asteroid M. Calley was in charge of overseeing the defensive missiles Magneto had gathered to prevent an attack on the asteroid. When Fabian Cortez attempted to fire the missiles to destroy Earth, Calley opposed him. It was also revealed that he was an old friend of Gambit.

Morlocks
When the Morlocks captured Cyclops and Jean Grey, Storm led the X-Men to rescue them. In the end, after a duel between Storm and Callisto, not only did the X-Men get Cyclops and Jean back, Storm also earned leadership of the Morlocks. They later appear in the episode "Out of the Past," where the Morlocks are captured by Lady Deathstrike and the Reavers and she unleashes an alien. The X-Men saved the Morlocks and defeated the alien.

 Callisto (voiced by Susan Roman) - The leader.
 Annalee (voiced by Kay Tremblay) - She seemed to have a greater control over her powers, causing the X-Men, including Jean Grey, to experience any state of mind she chose to place them in, from Wolverine believing himself to be covered with scorpions, to Jean believing herself to be a young child and Annalee her mother.
 Masque
 Sunder / Mark Hallett (voiced by Dan Hennessey)
 Leech (voiced by John Stocker)
 Tommy
 Plague (voiced by Judy Marshak)
 Erg
 Tarbaby
 Ape (voiced by Ross Petty)
 Mole
 Scaleface
 Glowworm
 Caliban
 Marianne - A Morlock who is exclusive to the series.

Shi'ar Imperial Guard
The Shi'ar Imperial Guard appeared in the episodes "Phoenix Saga" and "Dark Phoenix Saga." In the "Phoenix Saga," the Imperial guards track down Lilandra and the M'Kraan crystal, following D'Ken's orders, but after D'Ken fuses with the M'Kraan crystal and Lilandra becomes empress, the Imperial guards help the X-Men and the Starjammers defeat D'Ken. Later, in "Dark Phoenix Saga," the Imperial guards seek to destroy the Phoenix after she destroys a star system. Unlike the comics, the star system was deserted. So they go to Earth to stop Phoenix from destroying further systems.

 Gladiator / Kallark
 Oracle (Sybil)
 Starbolt
 Smasher / Vril Rokk
 Manta
 Tempest
 Titan
 Hussar
 Quake
 Hobgoblin / Shifter
 Warstar / B'nee and C'cil

Assassins Guild
 Bella Donna Boudreaux
 Julian Boudreaux

Villains
 Apocalypse / En Sabah Nur (voiced by John Colicos from 1992 to 1993, James Blendick from 1994 to 1996, then Lorne Kennedy in 1997) - Apocalypse wants to pit humans and mutants in a war and rule the stronger race. His first appearance is part of a plot line revolving around an offer to "cure" mutations. It is eventually revealed to be a trick to transform mutants into the Horsemen of Apocalypse. Apocalypse also appears in a storyline revolving around Cable. In this story, Apocalypse masquerades as a member of the Friends of Humanity, creating a techno-organic virus. In Cable's future (3999 A.D.), Apocalypse still wages his war against humanity and mutant-kind, opposed by Cable and his Clan Chosen. In the "Beyond Good and Evil" storyline, Apocalypse attempted to attain godhood by kidnapping the most powerful psychic beings from across the universe. He planned to kill them simultaneously, in order to release a wave of psychic energy powerful enough to re-create the universe in his own image so he could rule unchallenged. However, Cable, Bishop, Magneto, Mystique, and the X-Men foil his plans. After the psychics are freed, they use their combined powers to trap Apocalypse in the Astral Plane for all eternity. In one of the final episodes of the series, Apocalypse is shown to be communicating from the Astral Plane with Fabian Cortez, whom Apocalypse had turned into his servant prior to the Axis of Time events. He tasked Cortez to find a powerful mutant to serve as his vessel, which would allow him to return to our world. However, Cortez failed due to the interruptions of Beast and Caliban. This resulted in Apocalypse claiming Cortez, himself, as the vessel and Apocalypse lived once more. In this animated version, Apocalypse was depicted many times as an invincible opponent. None of the X-Men's powers combined could do him much harm. Apocalypse's plans were occasionally hampered by the time-travelers Bishop and Cable.
Powers: Immortality, super strength, invulnerability to harm, shape-shifting, psionic powers, teleportation, force-field generation, and flight.

 Mister Sinister / Nathaniel Essex (voiced by Christopher Britton) - Interested in the creation of more powerful mutants, Sinister had an obsession with Cyclops and Jean Grey, as well as other powerful mutants such as Magneto. Like his comic counterpart, this Sinister was capable of emitting energy blasts from his hands and was vulnerable to Cyclops' optic beams. He was served both by the Nasty Boys and the Savage Land Mutates. Like in the comics, Sinister was originally a British scientist during the Victorian era, though he was not mutated by Apocalypse. This version of Sinister experimented on mutants where he even obtained organs from his minion Jack the Ripper and used the knowledge obtained through his activities to mutate himself. An ancestor of Professor X, Dr. Xavier, was one of Sinister's opponents and attempted to save his victims. Despite his origins having no link to Apocalypse, Sinister joined forces with him when Apocalypse plotted to rewrite reality by harnessing the power of the Axis of Time.
 Shadow King / Amahl Farouk (voiced by Maurice Dean Wint) - Xavier defeated Shadow King and his psychic essence was trapped in the Astral Plane. He escaped briefly and possessed Storm's godson, Mjnari, in order to possess Storm. The Shadow King was defeated and trapped once again, only to be released after Professor X suffered an accident which left his mind vulnerable to the Shadow King's attempts to take possession of Xavier and leave his mind trapped in the Astral Plane.
 Sabretooth / Graydon Creed Sr. (voiced by Don Francks) - Sabretooth was depicted as a henchman for Magneto and was referred to as Graydon Creed Sr. instead of Victor Creed. In the earlier mainstream comics however, Sabretooth and Magneto have never come together in any real capacity.
 Omega Red / Arkady Rossovich (voiced by Len Doncheff) - Omega Red appeared in the episode "Red Dawn." In this episode he is resuscitated by three corrupt generals who want to recreate the Soviet Union and rule it. Colossus, with the help of the X-Men, fights to save his country and its fragile freedom from these forces of tyranny. Omega Red later reappeared in "A Deal With the Devil." In this episode, he is thawed and sent two miles (3 km) beneath the ocean to salvage a disabled, toxic, nuclear submarine threatening to break up near Hawaii. He also appeared in Wolverine's flashbacks, in which Team X fights against Omega Red and manage to freeze him. The details of their confrontation are unclear, as Wolverine's memories were altered to make him believe Omega Red killed Maverick and Silver Fox.
 Master Mold and the Sentinels (voiced by David Fox) - Master Mold and the Sentinels serve an important role during the first season. In one episode, the Sentinels, sent by Bolivar Trask and Henry Gyrich, kidnap the X-Men Gambit, Storm, and Jubilee while vacationing on the fictional island of Genosha. There, the three X-Men, along with several other mutants, are enslaved by Trask and Gyrich who are harnessing the mutants' powers to create a massive dam in Genosha whose water power will be used to run Trask's newly created Master Mold. The X-Men eventually escape Genosha and destroy most of the Sentinels when Storm floods the dam. Later on in the season, they learn that Trask has lost control of Master Mold, who is now stationed in Washington, D.C. Master Mold has Senator Kelly, and dozens of other important world leaders kidnapped, and demands that Trask replace their brains with computers that can be controlled by Master Mold. The X-Men help rescue Trask and Kelly from Master Mold, and at the end of the season's last episode, Professor X, with the help of Magneto, flies the X-Men's jet, full of explosives, into Master Mold's torso. Master Mold and all Sentinels are believed to be destroyed at this point, but they resurface in season four. This time Master Mold wanted to create a new body for himself, but the X-Men eventually destroyed Master Mold once and for all. Even though he was destroyed, Master Mold will be reconstructed at some point in history, becoming the ruler in Bishop's time-line.
 Nimrod - In the animated continuity, Nimrod came from the "Days of Future Past" time-line, where Bishop is its contemporary. Nimrod follows Bishop into the past to stop him from preventing the assassination of Senator Kelly that causes the future time-line. With the help of Storm's powers, Bishop was able to defeat Nimrod on numerous occasions.
 Bolivar Trask (voiced by Brett Halsey) - Trask is the creator of the Sentinels, and was much longer-lived than his comic counterpart, returning for several episodes (one of which ironically featured him on the run from his own creations, along with Gyrich). Trask was introduced here in the second episode of the series.
 Henry Peter Gyrich (voiced by Barry Flatman) - Gyrich appeared in the episode "Night of the Sentinels." He later appeared in the season one finale "The Final Decision," the episode "Courage" (season 4), and the series finale "Graduation Day." Gyrich's personality in the series was an extreme take on that of his appearances in the Avengers and X-Men comic books as he supported mutant oppression, and possibly even extinction, whereas in the comics he was merely distrustful of superhumans in general. In the series finale, he quickly revealed that Professor X was a mutant by calling on a force wave with a remote, which revealed his power of telepathy at a worldwide conference. This weakened Xavier and nearly killed him by the end of the episode, though in the end he was taken away by Lilandra to be cured. This attack also nearly wounded many other people at the conference. Gyrich was taken away in custody because of his insanity, but warned everyone not to trust anyone, because they might well be mutants.
 Graydon Creed (voiced by John Stocker) - Like in the comics, Graydon Creed's deep resentment toward mutants comes from his parents, Sabretooth and Mystique. Graydon wound up in the care of his father, who bullied and beat him constantly. Many years later, Graydon founded the F.O.H. (Friends of Humanity), an anti-mutant hate group that did everything in its power to vilify mutants. After the Beast's pardon by the President, Graydon's resentment grew even more and the F.O.H. began targeting the X-Men. Graydon began looking for new ways to exterminate mutant-kind. He hired a brilliant scientist (who turned out to be Apocalypse) to create a virus that would wipe out every mutant on Earth, but would be relatively harmless to ordinary humans. His followers infect a number of mutants and spread rumors that mutants carry the disease. However Bishop and the X-Men destroy the virus. When Beast began dating his former patient Carly, a human, Graydon had her kidnapped, but the X-Men rescue her. Before they leave, the X-Men set up a holo-projector outside displaying Xavier's profile on the mutant Sabretooth, real name: Graydon Creed Sr. Realizing that their leader was the son of a mutant, the F.O.H. leave him behind for the authorities. Later, Graydon returns to the F.O.H. to resume his old role as their leader. The council rules that first he has to prove himself. They tell Graydon to kill Sabretooth, Mystique, Rogue (his foster sister), and the demonic Nightcrawler, his own brother. Graydon kidnaps his mother Mystique and forces her to send a letter to Nightcrawler saying she was in danger. Fearing for his mother's life, Nightcrawler seeks the help of the X-Men Rogue and Wolverine. They locate the F.O.H.'s dam-base and walk straight into a trap. Graydon attempts to gas all of the mutants to death. They manage to break free and defeat him. Three of the council members inform him that he failed for the last time and as a result has been expelled from the order indefinitely. They parachute him to the house where Sabretooth was waiting as he prepares to deal with him.
 Trevor Fitzroy - Fitzroy was a guest-star in the two-part episode "One Man's Worth." Fitzroy, known as "the mutant traitor," under the orders of Master Mold, travels back in time to 1959 to murder Charles Xavier. In the cartoon, he does not kill those whose energy he absorbs.
 D'Ken - D'Ken was seen in the five-part "Phoenix Saga," where his history was very much like it was in the comics. He was also responsible for the death of Cyclops' parents, and him becoming an orphan on Earth. D'Ken gained control over the M'Kraan crystal, which gave him powers. D'Ken had fused with the M'Kraan crystal, so after the Phoenix fixes the crack that D'ken made on the crystal to gain its power, D'Ken was trapped inside it. The Phoenix later hid the crystal in the heart of the Sun.
 Erik the Red (Davan Shakari) (voiced by Lawrence Bayne) - Erik the Red was sent by D'ken to capture Lilandra and the M'Kraan crystal for him.
 Zaladane - Zaladane was featured in the two-part episode "Savage Land, Strange Heart". High priestess of Garokk, Zaladane recruits Sauron into her scheme to awaken the god.
 Garokk - Garokk was featured in the two-part episode "Savage Land, Strange Heart".
 Deathbird / Cal'syee Neramani - Deathbird made several appearances in the series. In flashbacks, she was seen at D'Ken's side when Christopher and Katherine Summers were abducted. Following Lilandra's ascension to the throne of the empire, Deathbird sought to overthrow her sister and install herself as Majestrix, for which she joined Apocalypse. However, Apocalypse was merely using Deathbird for his own plans. During the episode "Beyond Good and Evil," she attacked Lilandra alongside Apocalypse. However, he abandoned her at the mercy of Lilandra and Imperial Guard Praetor Gladiator. Apocalypse simply wanted a distraction so he could kidnap Oracle, the psychic of the Imperial Guard.
 Juggernaut / Cain Marko (voiced by Rick Bennett) - Juggernaut fully appeared in three episodes: "The Unstoppable Juggernaut," "Phoenix Saga" (part 3), and "Juggernaut Returns." He attempted to get revenge on Xavier in all three episodes.
 Mojo (voiced by Peter Wildman) - Mojo appeared in the episodes "Mojovision" and "Longshot."
 Spiral / Rita Wayword (voiced by Cynthia Belliveau) - Spiral worked for Mojo and helped him torture the captured X-Men by making them perform in television shows against their wills, but eventually betrayed Mojo when she met and fell in love with Longshot. Their relationship, however, turned for the worse and Spiral once again turned to Mojo's side in the end.
 Black Tom Cassidy - Cassidy teamed up with Juggernaut to kidnap Lilandra in the "Phoenix Saga." He and Banshee are referred to as brothers in the series continuity with Banshee being the elder.
 Cameron Hodge (voiced by Stephen Ouimette) - Cameron Hodge first appeared as a lawyer for Hank McCoy. Later, Hodge was an ambassador working for the mutant-oppressing Genoshan government. After the corrupt government was overthrown by the combined efforts of Cable and the X-Men, Hodge, who was now missing an arm and a leg courtesy of Cable, vowed to get his revenge on the mutants. He was fortunate enough to have met up with the techno-organic alien race known as the Phalanx. Restoring his missing limbs and granting him a fraction of their power, the Phalanx promised to help him get his revenge and, in exchange, he would help them assimilate planet Earth and its inhabitants. Hodge was defeated when the X-Men, with the help of Amelia Voght, Magneto, Mr. Sinister, and Warlock, drove the Phalanx from Earth.
 Purple Man / Zebediah Killgrave - The Purple Man appeared in the fourth episode of season five, "No Mutant Is an Island," as a telepathic mutant terrorist who plans on taking over the government using a group of young mutants under his mental control. In the end, the X-Man Cyclops gets in his way and eventually defeats him.
 High Evolutionary / Herbert Wyndham (voiced by James Blendick) and the New Men - The High Evolutionary is the Master of Wundagore. He seeks to create a superior generation of his New Men by using mutant DNA, mutating humans into beast-like beings, instead of experimenting on animals. He sets up a trap to capture Magneto, Quicksilver, and the Scarlet Witch, revealing to the twins that they are Magneto's children. He also appeared in a flashback, in which he fights Garokk and traps his essence in the ground of the Savage Land.
 Arkon (voiced by Paul Haddad) - Arkon appeared in the episode "Storm Front" (parts 1 and 2). In the series, Arkon unleashes terrible weather conditions over Washington, D.C., to get Storm's attention. It works and he begs her to return with him to his planet, Corsus, to save it from meteorological chaos, which threatens his people. After much pleading, Arkon convinces Storm. Intrigued by this dynamic leader but slightly suspicious, Storm departs, but leaves a clue for the other X-Men to follow. Once Storm saves the planet, she is proclaimed savior throughout this universe, and Arkon asks her to marry him. Later she finds out that his ships are bringing thousands of slaves from nearby planets, and knows that Arkon is a tyrant.
 Proteus / Kevin McTaggart (voiced by Stuart Stone) - Proteus appeared in the two-part episode "Proteus" (season 4), which was based on 1979–1980 Uncanny X-Men storyline. In the episode, he escapes from Muir Island to find out who his father is and creates havoc around the city, and the X-Men have to stop him.
 Red Skull / Johann Schmidt (voiced by Cedric Smith) - The Red Skull appears in the episode "Old Soldiers." He appears in Wolverine's flashbacks when Wolverine remembers his past. Red Skull had kidnapped a scientist and was working for the Nazis.
 Silver Samurai / Kenuicho Harada (voiced by Denis Akiyama) - Silver Samurai appeared in the episode "The Lotus and the Steel." He is given little characterization in the episode, reduced to a mere gang leader whose thugs terrorize a village where Wolverine has been living. The villagers stand their ground and Wolverine bests the samurai in single combat by taking advantage of Samurai's habit of teleporting behind him. Wolverine anticipates the move and disables the teleportation device, humiliating Samurai.
 The Phalanx - The Phalanx appear in the episode "The Phalanx Covenant." They are a techno-organic, extraterrestrial race bent on assimilating every other lifeform. They invade the Earth, though they are initially unable to assimilate mutants. This version of the Phalanx is an amalgamation of the comics' Technarchy and Phalanx.

Villain teams

Brotherhood of Evil Mutants
The Brotherhood of Evil Mutants in this series is based on the third incarnation of the team from the comic books. The group is led by Mystique, with the Blob, Avalanche, and Pyro as members of the group, and Rogue being shown as a former member. The group is revealed to have been initially financed by the mutant Apocalypse though only Mystique knew this. Notably absent from the series was the Brotherhood member and Mystique's longtime lesbian lover Destiny who was a major member of the team in the comics. As such, major changes were made towards the series' adaptation of "Days of Future Past" storyline, in which Destiny played a major role during the climax of the story.

 Mystique / Raven Darkholme (voiced by Rachel Carpenter, later by Jennifer Dale) - Mystique was shown as the leader of the Brotherhood, a close ally of Apocalypse, Rogue's foster mother, and Nightcrawler's birth mother. In the first season, Mystique aids Apocalypse in transforming several mutants into his Horsemen. Later he orders her to assassinate Senator Kelly, a task for which she impersonates the X-Man Gambit. She fails due to the interference of the real Gambit. In the second season, Mystique attempts to convince Rogue to return to the Brotherhood, though she fails in the end. Mystique once again appears as an ally of Apocalypse in the "Beyond Good and Evil" storyline; however, when Magneto realizes how mad Apocalypse's intentions are, Mystique joins him in trying to stop Apocalypse. In her final appearance of the series, Mystique is kidnapped by Graydon Creed, her child by Sabretooth. She is forced to send a letter to her other son, Nightcrawler, to lure him to a trap in exchange for her life. Creed attempts to kill all the mutants, but they escape. As Mystique flees, Nightcrawler gives chase because he wants to know why she abandoned him. Even though Mystique coldly tells him that she did not want him, Nightcrawler cannot bring himself to hate her and tells her that he will pray to God to allow him to forgive her. Touched that in spite of her cold treatment her son still cares for her, Mystique apparently sacrifices herself to save Nightcrawler when Creed attempts to shoot him. Though assumed dead by the X-Men, Mystique is shown to have survived and is last seen looking back at her two children with tears in her eyes.
 Avalanche / Dominic Szilard Petros (voiced by Rod Coneybeare) - Avalanche was always accompanied by Pyro and Blob. He usually acts as a hired henchman of Mystique.
 Pyro / St. John Allerdyce (voiced by Graham Halley) - He appeared in four episodes (although he only had lines in three). He was characterized as British (instead of Australian like the comics), using slang terms such as "old bean" and "old girl" in conversation.
 Blob / Frederick J. Dukes (voiced by Robert Cait) - In season one, he was one of many mutant captives on Genosha. He later appeared in several episodes with the Brotherhood.

Nasty Boys
While the Nasty Boys are barely a passing blip in the extensive history of the X-Men comics, the villainous team was featured several times in the series. Appearing first in the episode "Til Death Do Us Part (part 2)," the series featured four of the Boys: Ruckus, Gorgeous George, Hairbag, and Slab. The X-Man Morph, who had been resurrected by Mr. Sinister, had an "evil" side to his personality. "Evil" Morph was often a part-time member of the Nasty Boys, but Sinister increasingly lost control of him. The Nasty Boys reappeared in both parts of "Reunion," where, teamed with the Savage Land Mutates, they proved to be quite imposing to the X-Men, whom Sinister had rendered powerless. The X-Men eventually regained their powers, freed Morph from Sinister completely, and defeated Sinister and the Boys. After leaving the Savage Land, the Boys reappeared with Sinister in all four parts of "Beyond Good and Evil." Vertigo apparently accompanied them (Sinister had given her a Magneto-inspired energy boost in "Reunion") and was made into a member, despite her female status.

 Gorgeous George / George Blair (voiced by Rod Wilson) - George played a prominent role. He appeared in X-Men Adventures, a comic book based on the animated series.
 Ruckus / Clement Wilson (voiced by Dan Hennessey) - Ruckus played a prominent role as leader of the Nasty Boys. He seemed to be older, but the others often cracked jokes at him being Sinister's "lapdog." He also appeared in several issues of X-Men Adventures.
 Slab / Christopher Anderson - Slab also appeared with the Nasty Boys.
 Hairbag - In the show, Hairbag's powers were altered somewhat, giving him poisonous breath and the ability to fire drugged, quill-like hairs from his body.

Savage Land Mutates
Savage Land Mutates were the creations of Magneto, though they were later recruited by Mister Sinister.

 Sauron / Karl Lykos (voiced by Robert Bockstael) - Sauron became a major villain after the X-Men first visited the Savage Land. Unlike his psychiatrist persona, this version of Lykos was apparently an inhabitant of the Savage Land and was mutated by Magneto, though he later became a follower of Mr. Sinister. This version of Sauron did not appear to possess the psychic scream and fire breath of his comic counterpart. Despite this, he was a formidable foe in many episodes.
 Brainchild - A Swamp Man with an enlarged cranium who possesses psychic powers.
 Amphibius (voiced by Peter McCowatt) - A Swamp Man that was mutated into a humanoid frog.
 Lupo - A Swamp Man that was mutated into a werewolf-like form.
 Barbarus - A Swamp Man who was mutated to have four arms.
 Vertigo (voiced by Megan Smith) - Veritigo was one of the followers of Mr. Sinister in the Savage Land. In the series, her powers were amplified after Mr. Sinister genetically modified her with Magneto's DNA. Later on, she joins the Nasty Boys who were also working for Mr. Sinister.

Inner Circle Club
The Hellfire Club appeared in the "Dark Phoenix Saga" storyline, though it was renamed Inner Circle Club to prevent controversy regarding the use of the word hellfire, which could have prompted accusations of satanism. The Inner Circle's leaders aim to control Jean Grey and brainwash her into believing herself to be the Queen of the Inner Circle, though they only manage to unleash the Dark Phoenix.

 Sebastian Shaw
 Emma Frost - Emma made appearances as the White Queen of the Inner Circle Club. She appears in the first three parts of the "Dark Phoenix Saga" and is shown briefly among a group of telepaths in the episode "Beyond Good and Evil (part 4): End and Beginning."
 Jason Wyngarde / Mastermind (voiced by Nigel Bennett) - Wyngarde appears in the first three parts of the "Dark Phoenix Saga." He uses his powers to control the Phoenix, but ends up unleashing the Dark Phoenix. Wyngarde is also a member of the Mutant Resistance in the alternate reality shown in the first part of the episode "One Man's Worth."
 Harry Leland / Black Bishop
 Donald Pierce

Horsemen of Apocalypse
The Four Horsemen of Apocalypse were the same ones as in the X-Factor comics. The lineup was composed by mutants that submitted themselves to the so-called mutant "cure," developed by Dr. Adler (Mystique in disguise). The cure process transformed the four mutants: Autumn Rolfson / Famine (voiced by Catherine Gallant), Plague / Pestilence, Abraham Kieros / War (voiced by James Millington), and Angel / Death into altered mutants under the control of Apocalypse. The four-part episode "Beyond Good and Evil" featured another team of Horsemen, created by Apocalypse during his time in Ancient Egypt. The style of these Horsemen reflected their Egyptian origins.

Reavers
The Reavers appear alongside Lady Deathstrike when she goes down to the Morlock's tunnel and tricks Wolverine into coming down there, hoping to get him to open an alien ship that she found in the tunnel. When the ship is opened, an alien comes out of the ship and sucks the life out of the Reavers. So Lady Deathstrike has to work together with Wolverine to defeat the alien. In the end, the X-Men defeat the alien and all the Reavers' life energy is sent back to their bodies.

 Bonebreaker
 Pretty Boy
 Murray Reese
 Wade Cole
 Lady Deathstrike / Yuriko Oyama (voiced by Tasha Simms) - Lady Deathstrike was also a Reavers member. She had a romantic past with Wolverine, likely merging her character with Wolverine's former fiancée, Mariko Yashida. She first appeared in the episode "Out of the Past" (season 3). Deathstrike joined the Reavers and became a cyborg in order to avenge the death of her father, Professor Oyama, during Logan's rampage at the Weapon X headquarters. In this continuity, the Professor (of Weapon X) and Yuriko's father are the same man. In the comic's continuity, the Professor is a man named Thorton and has no blood relation to the Oyamas.

Weapon X
The Weapon X program was responsible for Wolverine's adamantium endoskeleton and fabricated memories. The program was directed by the Professor and Dr. Cornelius.  Weapon X captured the four members of Team X (Logan, Victor Creed, Maverick, and Silver Fox) in order to brainwash them to become an elite team of mind-controlled assassins. However, Wolverine escaped and his rampage through the Weapon X headquarters allowed Creed, Maverick, and Silver Fox to escape.

 Professor (in video and flashbacks)
 Dr. Cornelius (in shadows within video and flashbacks)
 Professor Oyama Never actually appears in the series. Mentioned by Professor Thorton in "Weapon X, Lies, and Videotape" and by Lady Deathstrike in "Out of the Past."
 Talos - Shiva / Talos appeared in the episode "Weapon X, Lies & Videotape." Due to network censorship, the robot's name was changed to Talos.

Mojo's Trackers and Wildways
Besides Spiral, Mojo employed a number of agents and servants:

 Major Domo
 Arize
 Gog
 Quark
 The Warwolves

The Colony and Brood
The Colony appear in the episode "Love in Vain" in a New Mexico desert. Wolverine witnesses the crash of a spaceship carrying horrific, alien bug-like creatures, the Colony, which overwhelm him. They differ from their appearance in the comics as these Brood are human sized with greenish skin and could fire electrical energy blasts from their tails. They also had four mechanical tentacles similar to Doctor Octopus and had an anti-gravity generator that allowed them to fly. People would be infected by spores and would turn into drones for the Colony. They also had red eyes and appeared similar to the Xenomorphs from the Alien movies.

Children of the Shadow

The Children of the Shadow appeared in the episode "Secrets, Not Long Buried" when Cyclops flies solo to Skull Mesa, a tiny western desert community of mutants and humans to see an old friend Dr. Prescott and his plane is blasted out of the sky. Injured and rendered powerless, he struggles into town only to discover his friend is missing and the town is caught in the grips of a criminal mutant group called the Children of the Shadow. The group hunts him down, seeing he is vulnerable because they have temporarily removed his powers and he is opposing them. As they try to make an example out of Cyclops his words get others to help and he recovers his powers from the healing aid of one of them, along with some other mutants Cyclops defeats them.

 Solarr / Bill Braddock - The leader of the Children of the Shadow. In this show, Solarr goes by the name of Bill Braddock.
 Chet Lambert - Exclusive to the TV series, Chet Lambert is a mutant who possesses intangibility.
 Toad / Mortimer Toynbee - Member of the Children of the Shadow. He possesses toad-like abilities.

The Avengers (in the Xavier-less time-line)

 Captain America
 Iron Man / Tony Stark
 Giant Man / Hank Pym
 Wasp / Janet van Dyne
 Black Widow / Natasha Romanoff
 Doctor Strange
 Hercules
 Scarlet Spider / Ben Reilly
 Doctor Doom / Victor von Doom
 Daredevil / Matt Murdock

Cameo appearances (heroes and villains)
 War Machine (James Rhodes), Sunfire, and Spider-Man were shown saving people from falling rubble in the "Phoenix Saga."
 Domino / Neena Thurman (voiced by Jennifer Dale), Feral / Maria Callasantos, Rictor / Julio "Ric" Richter, and Warpath / James Proudstar were seen as slaves on Slave Island. Domino also had a cameo appearance in the episode "Repo Man."
 Kangaroo / Frank Oliver, Random / Marshall Stone III, Arclight / Philippa Sontag, Blockbuster / Michael Baer, Tarbaby, and Black Panther (T'Challa) had a cameo appearance in the two-part episode "Sanctuary."
 Ghost Rider appeared briefly as a memory in one of Gambit's flashbacks in the episode "Final Decision."
 Deadpool / Wade Wilson - Morph briefly transforms into Deadpool. Deadpool's face is also seen in a flashback while Professor X is probing the mind of Sabretooth. In the "Phoenix Saga," an evil psychic projection of Xavier also created an illusion of Deadpool while tormenting Wolverine.
 Moondragon / Heather Douglas, Stryfe, and Typhoid Mary / Mary Walker had a cameo in the episode "Beyond Good and Evil (part 4)."
 Immortus (Kang the Conqueror/Nathaniel Richards) had a cameo after he was revealed as the true identity of Bender, the Axis of Time custodian.
 Gatecrasher had a cameo appearance in the episode "Proteus (part 1)."
 Eternity, Doctor Strange, Captain Britain / Brian Braddock, Spider-Man, Uatu the Watcher, and Thor had a cameo appearance in the "Dark Phoenix Saga" (part 3).
 Nick Fury, G. W. Bridge, and War Machine are seen in the episode "Time Fugitives (part 1)" aboard the S.H.I.E.L.D. Helicarrier watching a U.S. Senate committee hearing on mutants being blamed for infecting non-mutants with a "mutant plague" (genetically engineered by Apocalypse masquerading as a member of the Friends of Humanity). War Machine is also briefly seen earlier in this episode in the year 3999 AD, fighting against Cable and his allies.
 Elektra
 Hulk / Bruce Banner made a cameo as one of Xavier's robots in "The Juggernaut Returns."
 Punisher / Frank Castle is shown on a video game cover in the episode "Days of Future Past (part 1)" and as a robot in the episode "Mojovision."
 Senyaka, Forearm / Michael McCain, Reaper / Pantu Hurageb, Strobe, Tusk, Ape, Mole, Tommy, Random, Slither, and Copycat / Vanessa Carlysle appear as background extras in the episode "Secrets, Not Long Buried" as inhabitants of Skull Mesa alongside some mutant exclusive to the series like Andrew and Nicole (who are crystal creators), Watchdog (a dog-faced mutant with telepathy and power-negating abilities), Darrell Tanaka (who has healing powers), and an unnamed lady who can control plants.
 Daredevil / Matt Murdock can be seen as a dartboard in the episode "No Mutant Is an Island."
 Howard the Duck can be seen on Beast's T-shirt in the episode "The Phoenix Saga, Part Two: The Dark Shroud"
 Technet appear in a pub in Scotland in "Proteus (part 1)."
 Super-Skrull is briefly seen among the audience in the stadium in the episode "Mojovision."
 Arclight, Artie Maddicks, Blockbuster, Callisto, Carmella Unuscione, Copycat, Feral, Forearm, Kangaroo I, Marianne, Mole, Reaper, Sunfire Toad, and Tusk made cameo appearances during the episode "Graduation Day" amongst the mutant army Magneto assembles.

References

External links
X-Men (TV series) cast 

Lists of Marvel Comics animated series characters
Characters
TV series
Lists of characters in American television animation
Lists of characters in Canadian television animation